Władysław Hańcza (1905–1977) was a Polish actor and theatre director. During World War II he joined an underground theater. After the war he was a lecturer at the State Theatre Academy in Warsaw.

Selected filmography
 Popioły (1965)
 Sami swoi (1967) as Władysław Kargul
 Colonel Wołodyjowski (1968) as Nowowiejski 
 Chłopi (film) (1973) as Maciej Boryna
 Potop (1974) as Janusz Radziwiłł
 Nie ma mocnych (1974)
 Nights and Days (Noce i Dnie) (1975)
 Kochaj albo rzuć (1977)

External links

1905 births
1977 deaths
Actors from Łódź
Polish theatre directors
Commanders of the Order of Polonia Restituta
Recipients of the Order of the Banner of Work
Polish male film actors
Polish male stage actors
20th-century Polish male actors